Cyklokros Plzeň is a cyclo-cross race held annually in Plzeň, the Czech Republic as part of the UCI Cyclo-cross World Cup.

Men

Women

References
Men's results
Women's results

UCI Cyclo-cross World Cup
Cyclo-cross races
Cycle races in the Czech Republic
Recurring sporting events established in 1996
1996 establishments in the Czech Republic
Sport in Plzeň